The Abu Dhabi T20 Trophy was a 20-over cricket franchise tournament held in the United Arab Emirates. It took place between 4 and 6 October 2018 at the Sheikh Zayed Cricket Stadium. Six franchise teams took part in the first edition. The International Cricket Council (ICC) sanctioned the competition in June 2018.

Lahore Qalandars qualified for the final after winning both their games in Group A. The Titans from South Africa also qualified for the final after winning both their games in Group B. Lahore Qalandars won the title, after beating Titans by fifteen runs in the final.

Teams and squads
The tournament featured  the following teams:
Boost Defenders – Shpageeza Cricket League, Afghanistan
Hobart Hurricanes – Big Bash League, Australia
Lahore Qalandars – Pakistan Super League
Titans – Ram Slam T20 Challenge, South Africa
Yorkshire Vikings – Twenty20 Cup, England
Auckland Aces – Super Smash, New Zealand

The following squads were announced for the tournament.

Titans' Heino Kuhn replaced Dean Elgar as he was added in South Africa's squad for the Zimbabwe ODI series.

Group stage
The following fixtures were confirmed:

Group A

Group B

Final

References

External links
 Series home at ESPN Cricinfo

Twenty20 cricket leagues
Recurring sporting events established in 2018
Emirati domestic cricket competitions